The Lithuanian Free Market Institute (LFMI) is a non-profit non-partisan organization (think tank) based in Vilnius, Lithuania. It was established by six economists, including Petras Auštrevičius, in November 1990.

Based on the ideas of the Austrian Economic School, its mission is to promote free market ideals with a focus on freedom, responsibility, and limited government intervention. The team of LFMI conducts research on the main economic and policy issues, develops reform packages, plans legislative proposals, advises and consults government institutions. LFMI also publishes economic literature, conducts surveys, holds conferences and lectures.

The Chair of the Board is Elena Leontjeva, the co-founder of LFMI and President of LFMI from 1993 to 2001. In 2011, Žilvinas Šilėnas was appointed as the President and Edita Maslauskaitė as the Vice President.

See also
Liberalism in Lithuania

External links
Official website

Organizations based in Vilnius
Non-profit organizations based in Lithuania
1990 establishments in Lithuania
Austrian School
Think tanks established in 1990
Political and economic think tanks based in the European Union